The Pearson 28 is an American sailboat, designed by William Shaw and first built in 1975.

The Pearson 28 was replaced in the company product line by a new Shaw design, the Pearson 28-2, introduced in 1985.

Production
The Pearson 28 was built by Pearson Yachts in the United States from 1975 to 1982, but it is now out of production.

The design was introduced in 1975 and then updated in 1980 with a new keel and interior improvements. It remained in production until 1982 in this modified form.

Design

The Pearson 28 is a recreational keelboat, built predominantly of fiberglass, with a balsa cored deck and wood trim. It has a masthead sloop rig, an internally-mounted spade-type rudder and a fixed fin keel.

The early version also had an optional shoal draft keel.

See also
List of sailing boat types

Related development
Pearson 28-2

Similar sailboats
Alerion Express 28
Aloha 28
Beneteau First 285
Beneteau Oceanis 281
Bristol Channel Cutter
Cal 28
Catalina 28
Cumulus 28
Grampian 28
Hunter 28
Hunter 28.5
Hunter 280
O'Day 28
Sabre 28
Sea Sprite 27
Sirius 28
Tanzer 8.5
Tanzer 28
TES 28 Magnam
Viking 28

References

External links

Keelboats
1970s sailboat type designs
Sailing yachts
Sailboat type designs by William Shaw
Sailboat types built by Pearson Yachts